St. John's Block Commercial Exchange is a Richardsonian Romanesque building in Grand Forks, North Dakota, United States. It is a five-story brick and ashlar building, built during 1890–1891. 
It is smaller than one acre.  It was listed on the National Register of Historic Places (NRHP) in 1982.

It was included in a 1981 study of Downtown Grand Forks historical resources that led to a large number of NRHP listings.

References

Commercial buildings completed in 1891
Commercial buildings on the National Register of Historic Places in North Dakota
National Register of Historic Places in Grand Forks, North Dakota
Richardsonian Romanesque architecture in North Dakota
1891 establishments in North Dakota